This is a list of Indonesia national football team's competitive record in playing association football.

Honours

Continental
 Asian Games
 Bronze Medal: 1958
 Fourth place: 1954, 1986

 Far Eastern Games
 Silver Medal: 1934

Regional
 AFF Championship
 Runners-up: 2000, 2002, 2004, 2010, 2016,2020
 Third place: 1998
 Semi-finals: 2008

 Southeast Asian Games
 Gold Medal (2): 1987, 1991
 Silver Medal: 1979, 1997
 Bronze Medal: 1981, 1989, 1999
 Fourth place: 1977, 1985, 1993

Friendly
 Merdeka Tournament
 Winners (3): 1961, 1962,1969

 Aga Khan Gold Cup
 Winners (1): 1961

 King's Cup
 Winners (1): 1968

 Pesta Sukan Cup 1972
 Winners (1): 1972

 Jakarta Anniversary Tournament
 Winners (1): 1972

 Indonesian Independence Cup
 Winners (3; record): 1987, 2000, 2008

Individual records

Player records 

Players in bold are still active with Indonesia

Most capped players

Top goalscorers

Captain

Manager records

List of Managers

Team records

Competitive record

References

 
National association football team records and statistics